Tumu railway station is a station on the Beijing–Baotou railway located in Tumu Township, Huailai County, Hebei.

See also

 List of stations on Jingbao railway

Railway stations in Hebei